Jordyn is a given name and surname. Notable people with the name include:

Given name
Jordyn Allen (born 2000), Australian rules footballer
Jordyn Barratt (born 1998), American skateboarder and surfer
Jordyn Brooks (born 1997), American football player
Jordyn Burns (born 1992), American hockey player
Jordyn Colao, American beauty pageant titleholder
Jordyn Holzberger (born 1993), Australian field hockey player
Jordyn Huitema (born 2001), Canadian soccer player
Jordyn Listro (born 1995), Canadian soccer player
Jordyn Poulter (born 1997), American volleyball player
Jordyn Sheerin (born 1989), Scottish footballer
Jordyn Woods (born 1997), American model and entrepreneur 
Jordyn Wieber (born 1995), American artistic gymnast

Surname
William Jordyn (disambiguation), multiple people